The Wales men's national under-16 basketball team is a national basketball team of Wales, administered by the Basketball Wales. It represents the country in men's international under-16 basketball competitions.

The team finished 20th at the 1975 European Championship for Cadets. They also won five medals at the FIBA U16 European Championship Division C.

See also
Wales men's national basketball team
Wales men's national under-18 basketball team
Wales women's national under-16 basketball team

References

Basketball in Wales
Men's national under-16 basketball teams
B